Khodi Feiz (born 1963) is an industrial designer specialized in the fields of product design, furniture design, branding and strategic design.

Biography 
Khodi (Khodayar) Feiz (1963) was born in Iran and moved to the United States at the age of 14. Feiz studied Industrial Design at Syracuse University where his thesis project was a winner of the International Design Competition, Osaka in 1987. After graduation he worked for Texas Instruments Design Center and in 1990 moved to The Netherlands to work for Philips Design. At Philips Feiz was appointed project leader for Philips' Vision of the Future in 1996. In 1998, he founded Feiz Design Studio together with graphic designer Anneko Feiz-van Dorssen, where they specialize in the fields of product design, furniture design, and strategic design for multi-national companies such as Alessi, Artifort, Cappellini, Herman Miller, Logitech, Nokia, Offecct, Philips, Samsung and Swedese. In 2003 Feiz' work was presented in a solo exhibition at Vivid Gallery, Rotterdam. In 2014 Feiz was appointed as the art director for the Dutch furniture brand Artifort. The overriding inspirations for Feiz’s work can be summed up by: Clarity, concept and context.

Awards and Exhibitions

Awards 

 2019: IDEA Award, Cesto for StudioTK
 2017: Red Dot Award, Best of the best, IDSA Gold 2017, iF Product Design Award 2017, Logitech K780 Keyboard
 2016: Red Dot Award, Logitech K380 Multi-device Keyboard
 2015: Red Dot Award, Logitech K480 Multi-device Keyboard
 2014: Red Dot Award, Huawei Mediapad M1 Tablet
 2012: IDEA Award, Offecct Moment, Easy Chair
 2012: Red Dot Award and IDEA Award, Denon Cocoon, Wireless Speaker
 2012: Good design, Geiger Deft, Seating Collection
 2010: Red Dot Award, IDEA, ID Annual Design Review, Giannina family, Set of coffee products
 2009: Toy of the Year Award 2009, Swinxs, Childrens Educational Toy
 2009: ID Annual Design Review, Palma, Easy Chair
 2008: ID Annual Design Review, Peel seating, Convertible Furniture
 2008: ID Annual Design Review, Red Dot Award, Nokia md-6, Portable Speaker
 2008: Red Dot Award, IF Design Award, Nokia md-7, Portable Speaker
 2006: Dutch Design Award, Grolsch beer glasses 
 2003: Dutch Design Award, Lost Boys Program
 2003: Dutch Design Awards, Alessi desk objects
 2000: International Young Designers Award, Finalist, Design Report
 1999-2000: World Technology Award for Design, Finalist
 1987: International Design Competition, Award Winner, Osaka, Integrated Scuba Helmet (Student project)

Exhibitions 

 2007: Salone del Mobile, Milano, Solo Exhibition "Light Green"
 2003: Vivid Gallery, Rotterdam, Solo Exhibition
 2001: Salone del Mobile, Salone Satellite, Milano, Solo Exhibition
 2000: Salone del Mobile, Salone Satellite, Milano, Solo Exhibition

Notable Products 

 2020: Level, Invisible Smart Lock
 2019: StudioTK, Cesto Interactive Seating and Table elements
 2019: Swedese, Amstelle Chair and Poufs
 2018: Artifort, Figura Sofa
 2017: Artifort, Extens 2.0 Cabinets
 2016: Logitech, K780 Multi-device Keyboard (in collaboration with Logitech Design)
 2016: Artifort, Niloo Easy Chair
 2016: Artifort, Beso Chair Program
 2014: Denon, Envaya Bluetooth Speaker
 2014: Artifort, Bras Sofa
 2012: Offecct, Moment Easy Chair
 2009: Giannini, Giannina Family
 2008: Swinxs
 2008: Offecct, Palma
 2007: Tak Floor and Table Lamp
 2007: Bras EPS, Perf Family, Plana, System24
 2005: Nokia N70 smartphone (in collaboration with Nokia Design)
 2001: Alessi Desk Objects
 2000: Alessi Salsa bowl
 2000: Cappellini, Noor lamps

References

External links 
 Feiz Design Studio Official site

Industrial designers
Furniture designers
Product designers
Living people
Syracuse University alumni
1963 births